Sugata (सुगत) is a Sanskrit epithet for Gautama Buddha.

Etymology 
"Su"' is a prefix meaning good and "gata" is the past passive participle of "to go".

Among other meanings, Buddhaghosa says the Buddha is sugata because both the way he took (gata) is good (su) and where he has gone (gata) is good (su). The Mahayana author Haribhadra also says the Buddha is sugata because he is one from whom all faults are totally (suṣṭhu) gone (gata), or into whom all good qualities have gone (gata) with none remaining (suparipūrṇa).

It is customary to relate three denotations of sugata with three stages through which a buddha must pass in order to reach the goal of enlightenment: he has gone well beyond rebirth in saṃsāra, he has gone well into nirvāṇa, and he has gone well into the state of perfect buddhahood (samyaksaṃbuddha).

According to Bhikkhu Khantipalo, the term "sugato" can be translated as "auspicious", "fortunate" or more literally "well gone", "one who has gone to goodness", "one whose going was good". This refers to both the fact that his nirvana was good and that his awakening was a good for the world.

 Five Buddhas 

Teeuw and Robson mention "5 saugata" in their translation of Kuñjarakarṇa Dharmakathana  or Kakawin Kuñjarakarṇa, an Old Javanese kakawin from 15th century written by Mpu Ḍusun. Lokesh Chandra notes that in the Buddhist system this expression would be incorrect; as the pentad isn't termed pañcasugata ("Five Sugatas") but pañcabuddha  ("Five Buddhas"), and refers to the Five Tathāgatas :

 Vairocana (Shining Buddha),
 Akṣobhya (Immovable Buddha),
 Ratnasambhava (Jewel-Born Buddha),
 Amitābha (Endless-Light Buddha),
 Amoghasiddhi (Unfailing Buddha).

In Hinduism
In Vaishnavism, Sugata Buddha is regarded as the 9th avatar among the Dashavataras of Lord Vishnu. 

Some Vaishnavite schools argue that Sugata Buddha, the incarnation of Vishnu, was born around 1800 BC in Bodhi-Gaya (Kikata) to Ajana, and was a different person from Gautama Buddha.
Iconography
As per Agni Puran, Sugata Buddha is four handed like Vishnu. He holds Vedas, Lotus, Japamala and begging bag. 

 In Jainism 
Sugata ("pleasing gait") is a Prakrit name based on the beauty of the human body, mentioned as an example in the Aṅgavijjā chapter 26. This chapter includes general rules to follow when deriving proper names.

The Aṅgavijjā (mentioning sugata'') is an ancient treatise from the 3rd century CE dealing with physiognomic readings, bodily gestures and predictions and was written by a Jain ascetic in 9000 Prakrit stanzas.

See also 
 Buddhahood
 Gautama Buddha in Hinduism

References

Sources

Printed sources

 

 
 

 

 

 

 

 
 
 

 </ref>

 

Web sources

Epithets of Gautama Buddha
Forms of Vishnu